Kris Crummett is an American record producer and owner of Interlace Audio in Portland, Oregon. Crummett started recording in 2002. He has worked with many notable indie music record labels, including Rise Records, Epitaph Records, Fearless Records, Sumerian Records, Equal Vision Records, and Sony Japan. He is best known for his work with bands such as Sleeping With Sirens, Issues, Dance Gavin Dance, Drop Dead, Gorgeous and Alesana.

Interlace Audio
Interlace Audio was founded by Kris in 2002 after years of recording his own bands. He quit his job as a City Park Landscaper to focus on music production, and within the first year of Interlace Audio he produced successful records for Anatomy of a Ghost, Fear Before the March of Flames, Crosstide, and LKN thus making the studio an instant hit amongst post-hardcore and emo artists.

Commercial Success
In 2011 Kris partook in producing, engineering, mixing, and mastering the Sleeping With Sirens second and breakout record, Let's Cheers to This. The popular single "If You Can't Hang" has accumulated over 115 million views on YouTube and has since become a RIAA certified Gold single, with the rest of the album being RIAA certified Silver. 
In 2014, Kris had two Billboard Top 10 records. Issues (band)'s self-titled and debut record "Issues" debuted at #9 and Crown The Empire's sophomore record "The Resistance: Rise Of The Runaways" debuted at #7 on the Billboard Top 200. 
2015 Dance Gavin Dance's "Instant Gratification" debuted at #31 on the Billboard Top 200 charts and #18 on overall records sold. Another 2015 record, The Story So Far's self titled  "The Story So Far" placed on Billboard Top 200 #23, #1 Vinyl Sales, #2 Independent Albums.
2016 brought more success, Dance Gavin Dance's "Mothership" placed on the Billboard Top 200 at #13, #3 Vinyl Sales, and #2 Hard Rock.The same year, Issues' sophomore record "Headspace" reached the Billboard Top 200 at #20 and #1 on Hard Rock.
2018 stretched his hot streak with the ever-growing Dance Gavin Dance, the record "Artificial Selection" placed on the Billboard Top 200 at #15.

Production discography

References

External links 
 Production credits ArtistDirect
 Production credits AllMusic
 

Record producers from Oregon
Living people
Businesspeople from Portland, Oregon
1982 births